Dennison may refer to:

Places 
In the United States
 Dennison, Illinois
 Dennison, Minnesota
 Dennison, Ohio
 Dennison Township, Luzerne County, Pennsylvania

Other uses 
 Dennison (surname)
 Dennison Manufacturing Company

See also
 Avery Dennison Corporation, formed from the merger of Dennison and Avery
 Dennison Architects Limited, an Irish Architectural Firm specialising in Low-Energy buildings
 Dennison Limited, an Irish truck and trailer manufacturer
 Dennison's, a brand of chili manufactured by ConAgra Foods
 Denison (disambiguation)